Decades is the seventh compilation album by Finnish symphonic metal band Nightwish, and contains remastered versions of the original material. It was released on March 9, 2018, which is the same day that they began touring for the Decades: World Tour. The track listing is presented in reverse chronological order.

Track listing

Personnel
Floor Jansen – lead vocals (tracks 1–3 on CD 1)
Anette Olzon – lead vocals (tracks 4–7 on CD 1)
Tarja Turunen – lead vocals (tracks 8 and 9 on CD 1, all tracks on CD 2)
Tuomas Holopainen – keyboards, male vocals (track 12 on CD 2)
Emppu Vuorinen – guitars, bass (tracks 11 and 12 on CD 2)
Marko Hietala – bass (all tracks on CD 1, tracks 1-3 on CD 2), male vocals (tracks 1, 5, 7, and 9 on CD 1, track 2 on CD 2), backing vocals (track 2 and 3 on CD 1, track 3 on CD 2)
Sami Vänskä – bass (on CD 2, tracks 4–10)
Troy Donockley – Uilleann pipes, low whistle, bodhrán, bouzouki, male vocals (track 3 on CD 1), backing vocals (track 2 on CD 1)
Kai Hahto – drums (tracks 1–3 on CD 1)
Jukka Nevalainen – drums (tracks 4–9 on CD 1, all tracks on CD 2)

Charts

Weekly charts

Year-end charts

References

External links

2018 compilation albums
Nightwish albums
Nuclear Blast compilation albums